The white-capped monarch (Monarcha richardsii), or Richards' monarch, is a species of bird in the family Monarchidae.
It is endemic to the Western Province in the Solomon Islands.

Taxonomy and systematics
This species was originally described as belonging to the genus Piezorhynchus (a synonym for Myiagra).

References

white-capped monarch
Birds of the Western Province (Solomon Islands)
white-capped monarch
Taxonomy articles created by Polbot